"Esmer Kızlar Edalı" (tr)  is a Turkish folkloric tune  Karsilamas. There are similar folkloric tunes known as  Kızılcıklar Oldu Mu.

See also
Karsilamas

References

External links

Turkish songs
Year of song unknown
Songwriter unknown